Darren Carson is a New Zealand curler.

At the international level, he is a  curler.

At the national level, he is a two-time New Zealand men's champion (1999, 2000).

As of 2009, he was a President of the New Zealand Curling Association.

Teams

References

External links

 
 
 

Living people
New Zealand male curlers
Pacific-Asian curling champions
New Zealand curling champions
People from Ranfurly, New Zealand
Year of birth missing (living people)
20th-century New Zealand people